Moris Shevalyevich Nusuyev (born 28 July 1997) is a Russian footballer who plays as a defender for FC Merani Tbilisi.

Club career
He made his debut in the Russian Premier League for FC Tambov on 19 March 2021 in a game against PFC Sochi.

References

External links
 
 

1997 births
Living people
Russian footballers
Russian expatriate footballers
Association football defenders
Panathinaikos F.C. players
NK Celje players
ND Ilirija 1911 players
FC WIT Georgia players
FC Merani Tbilisi players
FC Tambov players
FC Urozhay Krasnodar players
FC Znamya Truda Orekhovo-Zuyevo players
FC Sioni Bolnisi players
Nemzeti Bajnokság III players
Slovenian Second League players
Erovnuli Liga players
Russian Premier League players
Russian Second League players
Russian expatriate sportspeople in Hungary
Russian expatriate sportspeople in Greece
Russian expatriate sportspeople in Slovenia
Russian expatriate sportspeople in Georgia (country)
Expatriate footballers in Hungary
Expatriate footballers in Greece
Expatriate footballers in Slovenia
Expatriate footballers in Georgia (country)